Edward Benninghaus Kenna (October 17, 1877 – March 22, 1912), nicknamed "The Pitching Poet", was an American Major League Baseball pitcher, college football coach and newspapers editor. He played for the Philadelphia Athletics during the  season.  Kenna played football as Georgetown University as a fullback in 1898 and at West Virginia University as a fullback and kicker in 1901.  He served as the head football coach at the University of Richmond in 1900 and West Virginia Wesleyan College in 1902.  Kenna was later an editor of the Charleston Gazette.  He died on March 22, 1912, in Grant, Florida.

Head coaching record

References

External links
 
 

1877 births
1912 deaths
19th-century players of American football
20th-century American newspaper editors
American football fullbacks
Philadelphia Athletics players
Major League Baseball pitchers
Georgetown Hoyas football players
Mount St. Mary's Mountaineers baseball players
Richmond Spiders football coaches
West Virginia Wesleyan Bobcats football coaches
West Virginia Mountaineers
Denver Grizzlies (baseball) players
Louisville Colonels (minor league) players
Milwaukee Creams players
Toledo Mud Hens players
Wheeling Stogies players
Editors of West Virginia newspapers
People from Grant, Florida
Sportspeople from Charleston, West Virginia
Baseball players from West Virginia